"Telegram Sam" is a song written by Marc Bolan for the British rock group T. Rex, appearing on their 1972 album The Slider. The song was their third UK number one single, remaining at the top of the charts for two weeks before being knocked off the top by "Son of My Father" by Chicory Tip.

The lyrics feature numerous figures such as Bobby (who is a natural born poet who is just outta sight), Golden Nose Slim (knows where you been), Jungle Faced Jake (about whom no mistake must be made) and Purple Pie Pete (whose lips are like lightning and are capable of generating a heat power sufficient to liquefy females). Despite their charms, the singer expresses his loyalty to his "main man", the titular Sam. It also contains these lines Marc Bolan wrote to refer to himself: Me I funk/but I don't care/I ain't no square/with my corkscrew hair, a line which industrial rock band KMFDM would borrow for their song "Me I Funk". The riff is similar in character to their massive hit from the previous year, "Get It On" but in the key of A rather than E. "Telegram Sam" was not as successful as "Get It On" worldwide, and it only peaked at number 67 in the Billboard Hot 100. Eventually, this was the band's last single charted in the US.

"Telegram Sam" was the first single to be issued by Marc Bolan's own T.Rex Wax Co. label, and was released on 21 January 1972. The b-side featured two songs in the UK, "Cadilac" (as printed on the EMI label of the original single) and "Baby Strange", the latter also included in the album The Slider.

"Telegram Sam" was written by Bolan about his manager Tony Secunda (Telegram Sam = Tony Secunda) who was his 'main man' in respect of him being Bolan's manager and narcotics supplier.

The single was recorded at the Rosenberg Studios in Copenhagen, Denmark in November 1971.

In 1980, it was covered by the gothic rock band Bauhaus as a single, which peaked at number 12 in New Zealand. It was also covered by the Croatian punk-rock band Psihomodo Pop.

Personnel
 Marc Bolan: lead vocals, guitar
 Steve Currie: bass guitar
 Mickey Finn: congas
 Bill Legend: drums
 Howard Kaylan: backing vocals
 Mark Volman: backing vocals
 Tony Visconti: backing vocals

Chart performance

Bauhaus version

"Telegram Sam" is the fourth single released by British gothic rock band Bauhaus.  It was released in 7" and 12" format, the latter featuring a cover of John Cale's "Rosegarden Funeral of Sores" as an extra track.

Track listings
7"
Side A:
"Telegram Sam" - 2:08

Side B:
"Crowds" - 3:13

12"
Side A:
"Telegram Sam" - 2:08

Side B:
"Rosegarden Funeral of Sores" - 5:31
"Crowds" - 3:13

Song appearances
The Bauhaus version was used in "What's the Big Deal About Bauhaus?", a 1998 episode of The Ongoing History of New Music.

Notes

Bauhaus (band) songs
1980 singles
4AD singles
1972 singles
UK Singles Chart number-one singles
Irish Singles Chart number-one singles
T. Rex (band) songs
Songs written by Marc Bolan
Song recordings produced by Tony Visconti
Fly Records singles
Reprise Records singles
1972 songs